Marcelo Flores Dorrell (born 1 October 2003) is a  professional footballer who plays as an attacking midfielder or winger for Spanish Segunda División club Real Oviedo, on loan from Arsenal. Born in Canada, he represents the Mexico national team.

Early life
Flores was born in Canada to a Canadian mother of English descent, and Mexican former footballer, Rubén Flores. He was raised in Georgetown, Ontario. As his father was the manager of the Cayman Islands women's national football team, Flores spent some time on the islands, where he was invited to a training camp by Ipswich Town youth development coach Steve Foley. He impressed during the week long camp, and joined the Ipswich Town academy.

In 2019, Flores joined the Arsenal academy on a free transfer. He made a bright start to the 2020–21 campaign with Arsenal's under-18s, scoring three goals in two games.

Club career
After training with the first team, he signed his first professional contract in October 2020. Shortly after, he was included in The Guardian's "Next Generation 2020", highlighting the best young players in the world.
He was called up to the Arsenal first team for the first time on April 4, 2022, making the bench for their match against Crystal Palace, although he did not appear in the match as a substitute.

On 20 July 2022, Flores joined Segunda División club Real Oviedo on a season-long loan. On 15 August 2022, he made his professional debut in a league match against FC Andorra in a 1–0 loss, coming on as a substitute.

International career
Flores was eligible to play for either Canada, England or Mexico. He was first called up to the England under-16 side in 2019, but decided to join up with the Mexico under-16 team that same year, playing every game at the Montaigu Tournament.

In December 2020, Flores accepted a call up to a Canada camp that would take place in January 2021, but later pulled out to remain with Arsenal. On 18 June 2021, Flores was named to Canada's provisional 60-man squad for the 2021 CONCACAF Gold Cup.

In September 2021, Flores featured for Mexico's under-20 side in a double-header against Spain. In November, Flores was called up by Luis Ernesto Pérez to participate at the 2021 Revelations Cup, scoring two goals in three appearances, where Mexico won the competition. Later that month, senior national team manager Gerardo Martino expressed the possibility of calling up Flores for the friendly match against Chile on 8 December. On 29 November, Arsenal confirmed that Flores had received his first senior call up.

Flores eventually made his senior national team debut in a friendly match against Chile, making his debut as an 83rd-minute substitute in the 2–2 draw. In May 2022, Flores committed to representing Mexico internationally, as he was still eligible to switch to representing Canada or England, having only participated in friendlies. On June 11, he appeared in a 2022–23 CONCACAF Nations League match against Suriname, officially cap tying him to Mexico.

Personal life
His two sisters, Silvana and Tatiana, are also footballers, and both moved from Arsenal to Chelsea in the summer of 2020.

Career statistics

Club

International

Honours
Mexico U20
Revelations Cup: 2021

Individual
Revelations Cup Best Player: 2021

References

External links
 
 

2003 births
Living people
People from Halton Hills
Mexican footballers
Mexico international footballers
Mexico youth international footballers
Canadian soccer players
Mexican people of Canadian descent
Sportspeople of Canadian descent
Mexican people of English descent
Canadian people of Mexican descent
Canadian sportspeople of North American descent
Sportspeople of Mexican descent
Canadian people of English descent
Citizens of Mexico through descent
Association football midfielders
Ipswich Town F.C. players
Arsenal F.C. players
Mexican expatriate footballers
Canadian expatriate soccer players
Mexican expatriate sportspeople in the Cayman Islands
Expatriate footballers in the Cayman Islands
Soccer people from Ontario